The 1993–94 season was the 53rd season in Albacete Balompié's history.

Squad
Retrieved on 1 February 2021

Out on loan

Transfers

In

Out

Squad stats 
Last updated on 1 February 2021.

|}

Competitions

Overall

La Liga

League table

Matches

Copa del Rey

References

Albacete Balompié seasons
Albacete Balompié